Decatur Hi-Way Airport  was a public use airport located three nautical miles (5.5 km) north of the central business district of Decatur, a city in Adams County Indiana, United States.

Facilities and operations
Decatur Hi-Way Airport was situated at an elevation of 842 feet (257 m) above mean sea level. It had one runway designated 18/36 with a turf surface measuring 2,009 by 180 feet (612 x 55 m). The airport had 33 aircraft operations per day: 73% local general aviation and 27% transient general aviation.

See also 
 List of airports in Indiana

References

External links 
 
 Aerial image as of March 1999 from USGS The National Map
 Accident history at Aviation Safety Network
 Aeronautical chart at SkyVector

Defunct airports in Indiana
Transportation buildings and structures in Adams County, Indiana